The mangrove finch (Camarhynchus heliobates) is a species of bird in the Darwin's finch group of the tanager family Thraupidae. It is endemic to the Galápagos Islands. It was found on the islands of Fernandina and Isabela, but recent surveys have failed to record the species on Fernandina. It has been classified as critically endangered by BirdLife International, with an estimated population of 20–40 mature individuals in 2021, located in two large mangroves on Isabela. A study has shown that the two small populations remaining on Isabela Island have begun undergoing speciation and that one or both populations will eventually become extinct due to a lack of interbreeding.

Habitat
As its name suggests, the mangrove finch lives in the mangroves of the Galápagos Islands. The mangrove finch feeds upon the various insects, larvae, spiders, and vegetable matter found in the mangroves. It closely resembles the far commoner woodpecker finch, but is not known to use tools.

Predators
The main predators of the mangrove finch are cats, fire ants, paper wasps, and especially destructive black rats and parasitic flies. The black rats (Rattus rattus) are predators that account for 54% mortality rate of the mangrove finch during egg incubation, while the larvae of the avian vampire fly (Philornis downsi) add an additional 14% mortality rate of newly hatched chicks. Due to high predation rates in 2007 and 2008, rat poison was spread throughout different mangrove sites where the finches lived, which decreased rat predation to 30% mortality of the finch eggs. A year before the rat poison was dispersed, predation was observed in 70% of nests and the average success of nesting was 18%.  By 2013, the avian vampire fly (introduced to the Galapagos Islands circa 1960s) had spread and killed about 55% of Darwin's finch nestlings within nests.

Conservation
The mangrove finch is classified as critically endangered on the IUCN Red List, with only 20–40 mature individuals as of 2021.

In January 2014, project researchers reported successfully raising 15 mangrove finch chicks in captivity and releasing them back into the wild. Since then, 36 fledglings have been "head-started" and the project is building on this success.

The Mangrove Finch Project is a bi-institutional project carried out by the Charles Darwin Foundation and Galapagos National Park in collaboration with San Diego Zoo Global and Durrell Wildlife Conservation Trust. The project is supported by the Galapagos Conservation Trust, the Mohamed bin Zayed Species Conservation Fund, Durrell Wildlife Conservation Trust, The Leona M. and Harry B. Helmsley Charitable Trust, Galapagos Conservancy, and the British Embassy in Ecuador.

References

Camarhynchus
Endemic birds of the Galápagos Islands
Critically endangered animals
Critically endangered biota of South America
Birds described in 1901
Taxobox binomials not recognized by IUCN